Harmony Cemetery can refer to:

United States
 Columbian Harmony Cemetery, a former cemetery in Washington, D.C.
 Harmony Cemetery and Zion Episcopal Church, a historic cemetery in Morris, New York
 Harmony Cemetery in Marlowe, West Virginia
 Harmony Chapel and Cemetery in Harmony, Rhode Island
 Harmony Grove Cemetery in Salem, Massachusetts
 National Harmony Memorial Park in Landover, Maryland